Daniel William McCafferty (14 October 1946 – 8 November 2022) was a Scottish vocalist and songwriter best known as the lead singer for the Scottish hard rock band Nazareth from its founding in 1968 to his retirement from touring with the band in 2013.

Biography
McCafferty was born in Dunfermline, Fife. Under the influence of artists such as Little Richard, Elvis Presley, Chuck Berry and Otis Redding, he became one of the founding members of Nazareth in 1968. He appeared on all of Nazareth's albums up to 2014 and toured with them for 45 years. He co-wrote some of the big Nazareth hits, including "Broken Down Angel", and "Bad Bad Boy". He released three solo albums.

Retirement from touring with Nazareth
On 29 August 2013, Nazareth announced McCafferty's retirement from touring with the band due to health issues. He elaborated on the specifics of the health issues and the state of his situation in an interview with the UK music magazine, Classic Rock.  He stated that he had not suffered a stroke as had been reported in the press.  He said that his chronic obstructive pulmonary disease (COPD) that has "worsened in recent years" had made him leave the stage in Switzerland in late August 2013 after only three songs, indicating that, "You don’t know when it's going to come on, but suddenly you can't breathe." Commenting about his most recent episode, at the Swiss festival, McCafferty maintained, "if you can't do the job you shouldn't be there — Nazareth's too big for that." McCafferty also revealed that another health problem was responsible for his onstage collapse at a concert in Canada in July 2013 – a burst stomach ulcer. He stated reflecting back on the incident, "I thought I'd be fine, but you lose so much blood when that happens."  In addition McCafferty said that he expected Nazareth to continue on without him.  "I really hope they get someone else," he declared. "I'm sure they will."

Although McCafferty retired from performing, Nazareth fans can still hear his voice on their 2014 album Rock 'n' Roll Telephone. The singer also revealed that he could record more new music, either with Nazareth or as a solo artist. He clarified: "To go into a studio and sing isn't like doing a gig. I could always make another record, but getting up to do an hour and three-quarters, and get people to pay money to come and see me — I can't do that." McCafferty expressed his appreciation to his fans near the end of the interview by saying: "Let everyone know I appreciate they've been there for all these years." He continued to sing live around the world and record on occasion. On 21 June 2019, he released a new music video titled "Tell Me". It was from the solo album Last Testament, released on 18 October 2019, McCafferty's first solo album since 1987's Into The Ring.

Personal life
McCafferty was married and had two children. He suffered from chronic obstructive pulmonary disease (COPD) and died on 8 November 2022, at the age of 76.

Solo discography

Albums
 Dan McCafferty (1975)
 Into the Ring (1987)
 Last Testament (2019)

Singles
 "Out of Time" (1975) # 41 UK
 "Watcha Gonna Do About It" (1975)
 "Stay With Me Baby" (1978)
 "The Honky Tonk Downstairs" (1978)
 "Starry Eyes" (1987)

References

External links
 
 

1946 births
2022 deaths
20th-century Scottish male singers
Scottish rock singers
People from Dunfermline
Nazareth (band) members
Scottish tenors
Blues rock musicians